The Soul Eater is a novel by Mike Resnick published in 1981.

Plot summary
The Soul Eater is a novel in which Nicobar Lane becomes obsessed by the Dreamwish Beast which roams space.

Reception
Greg Costikyan reviewed The Soul Eater in Ares Magazine #13 and commented that "it's well-written enough action for SF. It is, if you will, mindless fun, and recommended for aficionados thereof."

Reviews
Review by Baird Searles (1982) in Isaac Asimov's Science Fiction Magazine, May 1982 
Review by Tom Easton (1982) in Analog Science Fiction/Science Fact, June 1982

References

1981 American novels
American science fiction novels
Signet Books books